Saints of Los Angeles is the ninth and final studio album by the American heavy metal band Mötley Crüe, released on June 24, 2008. It was the first full-length studio album with the band's original lineup since 1997's Generation Swine, following the return of drummer Tommy Lee, and also their final album before their three-year hiatus from 2015 to 2018. 

Saints of Los Angeles debuted at No. 4 on the Billboard chart, selling about 100,000 copies in its first week. It debuted at No. 14 on the Australian ARIA chart, No. 5 in Sweden, No. 3 in Canada, No. 47 in Italy, and No. 9 in Finland (although it climbed to number 6 in its second week).

The album's first single, its title track, was their second highest-charting single in the US mainstream rock charts, peaking at number 5. However, subsequent singles fared less well: "Mutherfucker of the Year" peaked at number 29 and "White Trash Circus" at number 37 on mainstream rock charts.

Writing and music

Bassist Nikki Sixx stated in his blog that he believed the band were "on to some of the better songs we've had in years". A tentative working title – The Dirt – was eventually scrapped. "The album is loosely based on The Dirt," said Sixx. "Each song is like a mini-story, and you can plug it into the book. Some of its funny, some of its serious and in-your-face. It's like a typical, successful Mötley Crüe record."

The album features production and songwriting from members of Sixx's other band Sixx:A.M., as singer James Michael and guitarist DJ Ashba are involved in almost every song. Frequent Aerosmith collaborator Marti Frederiksen also was heavily involved with the songwriting process.

Critical reception
Saints of Los Angeles was met with "mixed or average" reviews from critics. At Metacritic, which assigns a weighted average rating out of 100 to reviews from mainstream publications, this release received an average score of 54 based on 11 reviews.

In a review for AllMusic, critic reviewer James Christopher Monger wrote: "Mötley Crüe have been trumpeting their hedonism for so long and so loudly that it's become more of a caricature than a way of life, and while Saints of Los Angeles is the best thing they've laid to tape since their codpiece heydays, it's more of a walk down memory lane/Sunset Strip than a legitimate call to arms." Bram Teitelman of Billboard said: "While not every song is a winner, the title track and sleaze anthem "This Ain't a Love Song" are standouts.

Tours
Two tours, Crüe Fest and the Saints of Los Angeles Tour, supported the album. Crüe Fest ran during the summer of 2008, with supporting bands were Buckcherry, Papa Roach, Sixx:A.M., and Trapt. The Saints of Los Angeles Tour ran during early 2009 and supporting bands were Hinder, Theory of a Deadman, and The Last Vegas.

Track listing

Singles

The first single, "Saints of Los Angeles", was released on April 11 and started airing on radio stations on April 15, 2008. The song was given further promotion through the music video game Rock Band, being released as downloadable content on the Xbox Live Marketplace and PlayStation Store on the same day. A video for the single was premiered at a press conference by the band on April 15. The song was performed on Jimmy Kimmel Live! and the Late Show with David Letterman. Jacoby Shaddix from Papa Roach, Josh Todd from Buckcherry, Chris Brown from Trapt, and James Michael from Sixx:A.M. all make cameos at the end of the video. This act had also been done as the band performed the song on their previous Crüe Fest tour. The song was featured in commercials and in promos for X-Games 14. The single version of "Saints of Los Angeles" does not include the backing vocals and the introduction from the gang vocal version. The title track was nominated for a Grammy Award for Best Hard Rock Performance but lost; it was Mötley Crüe's third nomination. Their previous nominations for "Dr. Feelgood" and "Kickstart My Heart" in the same category saw losses to Living Colour. The January 2009 issue of PlayStation: The Official Magazine lists Mötley Crüe's "Saints of Los Angeles" as fifth on its list of "Rock Band’s Five Most Unexpectedly Rockin' Downloadable Songs".

"Mutherfucker of the Year" was the second single to be taken from "Saints of Los Angeles".

Personnel

Mötley Crüe
Vince Neil – vocals
Mick Mars – lead guitar
Nikki Sixx – bass
Tommy Lee – drums

Additional musicians
James Michael – keyboards, backing vocals
Marti Frederiksen, Melissa Harding – backing vocals
Josh Todd, Jacoby Shaddix, James Michael, Chris Taylor Brown – backing vocals on gang vocal version of "Saints of Los Angeles"
DJ Ashba – rhythm guitar [uncredited]

Production
James Michael – production, engineering, mixing
DJ Ashba – co-production, additional engineering
Viggy Vignola – additional engineering
Dave Donnelly – mastering

Charts

Weekly charts

Year-end charts

Singles

Certifications

References

External links
 

Mötley Crüe albums
2008 albums
Concept albums
Eleven Seven Label Group albums
Alternative metal albums by American artists